The 2013–14 season was the 117th season of competitive football in Scotland. The season began on 13 July 2013, with the start of the Challenge Cup.

Transfer deals

League competitions

Scottish Premiership

Scottish Championship

Scottish League One

Scottish League Two

Non-league football

SPFL U20 League

Honours

Cup honours

Non-league honours

Senior

Junior
West Region

East Region

North Region

Individual honours

PFA Scotland awards

SFWA awards

Scottish clubs in Europe

Celtic
2013–14 UEFA Champions League

Motherwell
2013–14 UEFA Europa League

St Johnstone
2013–14 UEFA Europa League

Hibernian
2013–14 UEFA Europa League

Scotland national team

Women's football

League and Cup honours

Scottish Women's Premier League

Scotland women's national team

Glasgow City
2013–14 UEFA Women's Champions League

Deaths
1 July: Eddie Moran, 82, Leicester City, Stockport County, Rochdale and Crewe Alexandra forward.
17 July: Davie White, 80, Clyde wing half; Clyde, Rangers and Dundee manager.
22 July: Lawrie Reilly, 84, Hibernian and Scotland player; member of the Famous Five forward line.
1 August: Colin McAdam, 61, Dumbarton, Partick Thistle, Rangers and Hearts player.
14 August: Johnny Hamilton, 78, Hearts and Berwick Rangers winger.
16 August: John Ryden, 82, Alloa Athletic and Tottenham Hotspur centre half.
20 August: Fred Martin, 84, Aberdeen and Scotland goalkeeper.
24 August: Gerry Baker, 75, Hibernian, Motherwell and St Mirren forward.
10 October: Norrie Martin, 74, Rangers goalkeeper.
18 October: Charlie Dickson, 79, Dunfermline Athletic forward.
30 October: Dave MacFarlane, 46, Rangers and Kilmarnock midfielder.
6 November: Sammy Taylor, 80, Falkirk winger.
14 November: Jim McCluskey, 63, referee.
29 December: Billy Carmichael, 80, Clyde player and chairman.
10 January: Ian Redford, 53, Rangers and Dundee United midfielder.
13 January: Bobby Collins, 82, Celtic and Scotland midfielder.
8 February: Andy Paton, 91, Motherwell, Hamilton Academical and Scotland defender.
9 March: John Christie, 84, Ayr United goalkeeper.
23 March: Ashley Booth, 76, St Johnstone and East Fife defender.
5 April: Gordon Smith, 59, St Johnstone full-back.
8 April: Sandy Brown, 75, Partick Thistle and Scottish League XI full-back.
11 April: Rolando Ugolini, 89, Celtic, Dundee United and Berwick Rangers goalkeeper.
16 April: Frank Kopel, 65, Dundee United and Arbroath defender.
24 April: Sandy Jardine, 65, Rangers, Hearts and Scotland defender.
24 June: David Taylor, 60, Scottish Football Association chief executive.

References

 
Seasons in Scottish football